Demetrio Velázquez is an Argentine biathlete. He competed in the relay event at the 1980 Winter Olympics.

References

Year of birth missing (living people)
Living people
Argentine male biathletes
Olympic biathletes of Argentina
Biathletes at the 1980 Winter Olympics
Place of birth missing (living people)